Aurelio Barili was an Italian painter of the Baroque period, born and active in Parma. In 1588, he painted frescoes in the Parmesan church of San Giovanni Evangelista and the Sanctuary of Santa Maria della Steccata.

References

16th-century Italian painters
Italian male painters
Painters from Parma
Italian Baroque painters
Year of death unknown
Year of birth unknown